Anna Sipos (3 April 1908 – 1 January 1988) was a Hungarian international table tennis player.

Table tennis career
She won 21 medals in the World Table Tennis Championships Eleven of these were gold medals. including six consecutive women's doubles wins when partnering Mária Mednyánszky.

Halls of Fame
Sipos was inducted into the International Table Tennis Foundation Hall of Fame in 1993. Sipos, who was Jewish, was inducted into the International Jewish Sports Hall of Fame in 1996.

References

See also
List of select Jewish table tennis players
List of table tennis players
List of World Table Tennis Championships medalists

Hungarian female table tennis players
1908 births
1988 deaths
Hungarian Jews
Jewish table tennis players